Information and Learning Technology (or ILT) is a term mainly used in the British further education sector. It describes the methods of using technology to enhance the learning experience within education.

Possible applications of Information and Learning Technology
 Use of sound within an otherwise static presentation: There may be an image in a PowerPoint presentation, which could be clicked upon in different areas to provide audio commentary.
 Use of digital video or digital images for learning activities.
 Use of a VLE to run courses and activities within and outside an educational establishment.
 Interactive quizzes/activities - either online or within a classroom using an electronic voting system made up of infra-red handsets and a receiver.
 Use of podcasts or downloadable MP3s for classroom notes, revision or whole lectures.
 Use of collaborative documents within a group environment.
 Use of planification, budget-tracking and resource management software such as a training management system to streamline back-office training processes.

References

Training